Nafees Ahmad is an Indian politician and a member of 17th Legislative Assembly of Azamgarh, Uttar Pradesh of India. He represents the Gopalpur constituency of Uttar Pradesh and is a member of the Samajwadi Party.

Early life and education
Ahmad was born 8 July 1980 in Sadar, Azamgarh, Uttar Pradesh to Altaf Ahmad. He married Nishad Akhtar in 2004, they have one son and three daughters. He belongs to Muslim family. He did his B.A. degree from Aligarh Muslim University and had M.A. degree from Chhatrapati Shahu Ji Maharaj University, Kanpur.

Political career
Ahmad was President of Aligarh Muslim University Students' Union. Ahmad is representing as MLA of Gopalpur since 2017,  as a member of Samajwadi Party. In 17th Legislative Assembly of Uttar Pradesh (2017) elections he defeated Bharatiya Janata Party candidate Shrikrishna Pal by a margin of 14,960 votes.

Posts held

References

Samajwadi Party politicians
Living people
Uttar Pradesh MLAs 2017–2022
1980 births
Uttar Pradesh MLAs 2022–2027
Samajwadi Party politicians from Uttar Pradesh